The mola carplet (Amblypharyngodon mola) is a species of carplet in the family Cyprinidae. It is found in Afghanistan, Pakistan, India, Bangladesh, and Myanmar, although IUCN considers its presence certain only in Pakistan, India, and Bangladesh. Adult Amblypharyngodon mola are typically found in ponds, canals, beels, slow-moving streams, nullahs, and paddy fields. They can reach  in total length.

In Indian subcontinent mola carplet has value as foodfish.

References

Amblypharyngodon
Fish of Afghanistan
Fish of Bangladesh
Freshwater fish of India
Fish of Myanmar
Fish of Pakistan
Fish described in 1822
Taxa named by Francis Buchanan-Hamilton